Assane N'Diaye (August 1, 1974 – February 13, 2008) was a football defender from Senegal. As well as playing in the centre of defence, N'Diaye was accomplished as a defensive midfielder. His main footballing attributes were mostly physical, his strength and pace in particular, however he also was an unnervingly accurate passer. He played a key role for Shakhtar Donetsk during their first league win in 2002. Around the time of his move to Shakhtar, he was very highly rated and great things were expected of him. His attributes on  Championship Manager 01/02 in particular, showed his perceived potential. However, one of the criticisms directed at N'Diaye was his supposed lack of passion and determination, something which may have halted his ascent to the top level of football.

He died in 2008 after a short illness at the age of 33.

References

External links
Profile on Shakhtar Donetsk fan site (Russian)
Interview (Russian)
Obituary (French)

1974 births
2008 deaths
Senegalese footballers
Senegal international footballers
Senegalese expatriate footballers
2000 African Cup of Nations players
FC Shakhtar Donetsk players
Association football defenders
ASC Jeanne d'Arc players
Ukrainian Premier League players
Expatriate footballers in Ukraine
Senegalese expatriate sportspeople in Ukraine